Ricardo Odnoposoff (February 24, 1914 – October 26, 2004) was a Jewish Argentine-Austrian-American violinist of the 20th century. He was a former concertmaster of the Vienna State Opera and Vienna Philharmonic. He was dismissed on September 1, 1938 because he was unable to produce an Ariernachweis (Aryan certificate). He eventually became a citizen of the United States.

Early life and studies 

Ricardo was one of three children born in Buenos Aires to Mauricio (alternate spelling: Moisés) Odnoposoff and Juana (née Veinstein; alternate spelling Weinstein). Mauricio Odnoposoff had emigrated from Russia to Argentina with his father. Ricardo first learned to play the violin in Buenos Aires. Mauricio and Juana Odnoposoff moved to Germany where their children, Ricardo, Adolfo, and Nélida, continued studying music.  Ricardo studied at the Academy of Music in Berlin from 1928 and in 1931 studied violin under Carl Flesch and composition under Paul Hindemith. At the end of his studies, at the age of just 17, he first appeared as a soloist with the Berlin Philharmonic Orchestra under Erich Kleiber.

In 1932 he won the second prize at the prestigious Violin Competition in Vienna and in 1937 the second prize in the Eugène Ysaÿe Competition in Brussels. David Oistrakh, who took first prize, reported in a letter to his wife from the Brussels competition: "... when I arrived, Odnoposoff played Tchaikovsky. He played wonderfully."

Odnoposoff was already a follower of Arnold Rosé, concertmaster of the Vienna Philharmonic Orchestra, and taught at the State Academy, where Norbert Brainin, the future leader of the Amadeus Quartet was one of his students.

In 1933, without an audition, Clemens Krauss, director of the Vienna State Opera, offered the 19-year-old Odnoposoff a position as concertmaster.

Exile 
After the Anschluss (annexation of Austria into Nazi Germany), Odnoposoff was unable to produce an Ariernachweis (Aryan certificate). He was therefore dismissed on September 1, 1938 from the Orchestra of the Vienna State Opera and the Vienna Philharmonic and had to return to Argentina.

In the early 1940s Odnoposoff moved to the United States, where he gave his Carnegie Hall debut in 1944. According to the New York Times, Odnoposoff "took his audience by storm by the virtuosity, power and fire of his performances." During this time he worked with conductors such as Leonard Bernstein, Arturo Toscanini, Fritz Busch and André Cluytens and worked as a teacher. In 1953 he became an American citizen.

Return to Austria 
In 1956 he returned to Vienna and taught until 1993 at the Academy of Music, where Joseph Sivo was one of his students. He produced some recordings with the WDR Symphony Orchestra Cologne under Franz Marszalek, including the Violin Concerto no. 22 of Viotti. From 1964 Odnoposoff also taught at the University of Music and Performing Arts Stuttgart, where, among others, Michael Jelden, Alfred Csammer, Michael Eichinger, Helmut Mebert and Rainer Kussmaul were among his pupils. From 1975 to 1984 he taught at the Academy of Music in Zurich.

Odnoposoff played on the "ex Ladenburg" Guarneri del Gesù of 1735. His violin playing was outstanding with a great sonorous, yet mellow sound, with masterly mastery of technique. Many of his photographs reflect the great joy that lay behind his playing.

His grave is located in Vienna on the Grinzinger Cemetery (Group 19, no. 36A).

Awards 
 Austrian Decoration for Science and Art
 Honorary Medal of the Austrian capital, Vienna, in silver
 Medal of Merit of the State of Baden-Württemberg
 Nicolai Medal and honorary member of the Vienna Philharmonic

Musical family 
Ricardo's brother, Adolfo Odnoposoff, was a famous cellist in Israel and the Americas.

Ricardo's sister, Nélida Odnoposoff (born 1919), was a critically acclaimed Argentine concert pianist whose European debut was in 1935 in Berlin.  Growing up in Buenos Aires, she had been a protégée of the Argentine pianist Edmundo Piazzini (es). In Berlin, she studied with Hansi Freudberg.  Nélida concertized until the late 1950s.  During the early 1940s, she was associated with the Opera and Ballet of Montevideo and soloed with important orchestras of Latin America.

See also 
 Vienna Philharmonic: Period under National Socialism

References

Other sources 
 Oesterreichisches Musiklexikon. Volume 3. (ed. Rudolf Flotzinger), Austrian Academy of Sciences, Vienna 2004, . 
 Victims, perpetrators, spectators. 70 years later - The Vienna State Opera exhibition catalog of the Vienna State Opera, Vienna 2008.
 Query: Reviews in New York Times

External links 
 Works by and about Ricardo Odnoposoff in the catalog of the German National Library 
 Ludwig van Beethoven, Concerto for Piano, Violin, Cello and Orchestra in C major, Op. 56 with Ricardo Odnoposoff (violin), Stefan Auber (cello), Angelica Morales (piano), Vienna Philharmonic Orchestra (cond. Felix Weingartner)

20th-century Austrian people
20th-century classical violinists
Austrian classical violinists
Male classical violinists
Players of the Vienna Philharmonic
Concertmasters
Concertmasters of the Vienna Philharmonic
Recipients of the Order of Merit of Baden-Württemberg
1914 births
2004 deaths
Jewish classical violinists
20th-century male musicians
Argentine expatriates in Germany
Argentine emigrants to Austria
Austrian expatriates in the United States